This is a list of the mammal species recorded in Saint Helena. Of the mammal species in Saint Helena, one is vulnerable.

The following tags are used to highlight each species' conservation status as assessed by the International Union for Conservation of Nature:

Some species were assessed using an earlier set of criteria. Species assessed using this system have the following instead of near threatened and least concern categories:

Order: Cetacea (whales) 

The order Cetacea includes whales, dolphins and porpoises. They are the mammals most fully adapted to aquatic life with a spindle-shaped nearly hairless body, protected by a thick layer of blubber, and forelimbs and tail modified to provide propulsion underwater.

Suborder: Mysticeti
Family: Balaenopteridae
Genus: Balaenoptera
 Common minke whale, B. acutorostrata LC
 Antarctic minke whale, Balaenoptera bonaerensis DD
 Sei whale, Balaenoptera borealis EN
 Bryde's whale, Balaenoptera brydei DD
 Blue whale, Balaenoptera musculus EN
 Fin whale, Balaenoptera physalus EN
Genus: Megaptera
 Humpback whale, Megaptera novaeangliae LC
Family: Balaenidae 
Genus: Eubalaena
 Southern right whale, Eubalaena australis LC
Suborder: Odontoceti
Superfamily: Platanistoidea
Family: Physeteridae
Genus: Physeter
 Sperm whale, Physeter macrocephalus VU
Family: Kogiidae
Genus: Kogia
 Pygmy sperm whale, Kogia breviceps DD
 Dwarf sperm whale, Kogia sima DD
Family: Ziphidae
Genus: Berardius
 Arnoux's beaked whale, Berardius arnuxii DD
Subfamily: Hyperoodontinae
Genus: Mesoplodon
 Blainville's beaked whale, Mesoplodon densirostris DD
 Gray's beaked whale, Mesoplodon grayi DD
 Hector's beaked whale, Mesoplodon hectori DD
 Strap-toothed whale, Mesoplodon layardii DD
Genus: Ziphius
 Cuvier's beaked whale, Ziphius cavirostris DD
Family: Delphinidae (marine dolphins)
Genus: Steno
 Rough-toothed dolphin, Steno bredanensis DD
Genus: Tursiops
 Common bottlenose dolphin, Tursiops truncatus DD
Genus: Lagenodelphis
 Fraser's dolphin, Lagenodelphis hosei DD
Genus: Stenella
 Pantropical spotted dolphin, Stenella attenuata LR/cd
 Atlantic spotted dolphin, Stenella frontalis DD
 Spinner dolphin, Stenella longirostris LR/cd
 Striped dolphin, Stenella coeruleoalba DD
Genus: Orcinus
 Killer whale, Orcinus orca DD
Genus: Pseudorca
 False killer whale, Pseudorca crassidens LR/lc
Genus: Feresa
 Pygmy killer whale, Feresa attenuata DD
Genus: Globicephala
 Short-finned pilot whale, Globicephala macrorhynchus DD
Genus: Peponocephala
 Melon-headed whale, Peponocephala electra DD

Order: Carnivora (carnivorans) 

There are over 260 species of carnivorans, the majority of which feed primarily on meat. They have a characteristic skull shape and dentition. 
Suborder: Caniformia
Family: Otariidae (eared seals, sealions)
Genus: Arctophoca
 Subantarctic fur seal, A. tropicalis 
Family: Phocidae (earless seals)
Genus: Hydrurga
 Leopard seal, H. leptonyx 
Genus: Mirounga
 Southern elephant seal, M. leonina

Notes

References

See also
List of chordate orders
Lists of mammals by region
List of prehistoric mammals
Mammal classification
List of mammals described in the 2000s

Saint Helena
Mammals

Saint Helena